Sha Tau Kok is a closed town in Hong Kong. The last remaining major settlement in the Frontier Closed Area, it is Hong Kong's northernmost town.

Geography

The small rural village of Sha Tau Kok is located on the northern shoreline of Starling Inlet, 10 km north-east of Fanling. The town centre is by the sea and the northern part of the town encompasses the hill known as Yuen Tuen Shan.

A section of Starling Inlet located offshore of Sha Tau Kok is one of the 26 designated marine fish culture zones in Hong Kong.

History
At the time of the 1911 census, the population of Sha Tau Kok was 14.

In 2022, a pilot scheme was announced, where limited areas of the town were opened to tourists.

The Town 

Sha Tau Kok on the Hong Kong side of the border is a rural town, it is a part of the North District. The town has a post office, a bank and a few shops. Most of its residents are from Hakka farming or Hoklo (Hokkien) fishing backgrounds. As both farming and fishing have declined in the past few decades, better educated younger people tend to move out and live and work in urban areas. Older villagers, however, remain, most living in the government housing complex in Sha Tau Kok or in other nearby villages. Many working families return to visit at weekends, during festivals or on holidays.

Border

Sha Tau Kok Control Point is one of Hong Kong's border crossing points at the geographical land border between Hong Kong and Shenzhen in China. The others are Man Kam To Control Point, Lo Wu Control Point, Lok Ma Chau Control Point, Lok Ma Chau Spur Line Control Point, Heung Yuen Wai Control Point and Shenzhen Bay Control Point.

The border between mainland China and Hong Kong runs along Chung Ying Street. There is a perception of it being a notorious point of goods trafficking. When the checkpoint opened, a flow of Chinese nationals entered Chung Ying Street with visiting permits. Some  make several trips a day, acquiring goods and abusing the custom tariff limits on goods. These traffickers then unload their burden to collect their pay inside mainland Shatoujiao. Although there are a lot of goods leaving Hong Kong from Sha Tau Kok via Chung Ying Street, there is also an inflow of foodstuffs and other commodities that come through from China into Hong Kong throughout the day, only limited by the closure of the Chinese customs post.

The control point of the access to Shenzhen is located northwest of the hill in Shan Tsui.

An influx of mainland China workers flow into Chung Ying Street from 7am onwards when the custom post opens. Residents from the Chung Ying Street area are free to pass in and out of the Chinese border post as they have residency passes. Other non-residents must be issued permits to enter from the Chinese authorities. Since the early 1990s Chung Ying Street has been an established tourist site famous for imported products via Hong Kong, where prices may be higher than within China.

It is possible to travel into Shatoujiao on the China side, via the Sha Tau Kok border. Coaches run at a regular schedule from Luen Wo Hui Bus Terminus, situated near the Luen Wo Market and Library complex, and from Fanling MTR station. Tickets cost HK$20 for each passenger as of 2005. Travellers are taken through the Shek Chung Au border checkpoint without permit search, then heading directly to the Sha Tau Kok Control Point.

Here, passengers alight, go through customs, and have their documents processed, before reboarding the coach to be driven to the mainland border immigration checkpoint. They alight and take all their belongings through the mainland Chinese customs and again have their documents processed. Travellers from outside China are advised to obtain entry visas from the appropriate authorities, or via a travel agent before attempting the entry. Hong Kong residents of Chinese nationality should hold Home Return Permits for entry into China.

On 27 January 2005, it was announced that street maps for tourists were put up around Shatoujiao, to aid tourists' navigation. A museum situated near the harbour in Chung Ying Street was built to celebrate the transfer of the sovereignty of Hong Kong. It has on display a history of Sha Tau Kok and its place in the incorporation of territory into British Hong Kong at the end of the 19th century. A bronze Peace Bell was installed nearby.

Public housing 

Sha Tau Kok Chuen is a public housing estate within the Closed Area built to accommodate the residents affected by the clearance in Sha Tau Kok Closed Area. It consists of 51 low-rise blocks completed in 1988, 1989 and 1991, and it is the public housing estate with the most number of blocks in Hong Kong.

Transport

The terminus of Sha Tau Kok Railway, which ceased to operate on 1 April 1929 and was replaced by Sha Tau Kok Road, was located in the town. Sha Tau Kok Railway was built from the original narrow gauge of the KCR British Section, which was replaced by standard gauge. Since then, however, the area formerly occupied by the terminus is still known as the train station or fo cha teu in the local dialects (火車頭 Pinyin:huǒchētóu). Currently, both Kowloon Motor Bus and minibus services Sha Tau Kok. There are a few shops nearby, at Sha Tau Kok Chuen.

Today, Sha Tau Kok has a bus station served by the KMB Route 78K service as well as the smaller sixteen-seater minibus or public light bus service route number 55K. Both begin in Sheung Shui and pass through Luen Wo Hui before terminating at Sha Tau Kok. However, passengers may not proceed through the Closed Area border checkpoint if they do not carry a valid permit. Police personnel will board the bus at the checkpoint to check the ID Card or identification documents and the required Frontier Closed Area permit of each passenger. If passengers do not possess these documents, they will be asked to leave the bus by police personnel.

Education
Sha Tau Kok is in Primary One Admission (POA) School Net 83. Within the school net are two aided schools (operated independently but funded with government money): Fuk Tak Education Society Primary School and Sha Tau Kok Central Primary School. No government schools are in the net.

Shan Tsui Public School is in Sha Tau Kok. In 2013 90% of the about 200 students were Hong Kong residents living in Shenzhen.

Other schools:
 Kwan Ah School
 Sha Tau Kok Central Primary School
 Tai Wah Public Schools

Notable people
 Lee Hong Lim – Hong Kong First Division footballer
 Lee Wai Lim – Hong Kong First Division footballer

See also
 Kuk Po
 Lai Chi Wo
 List of places in Hong Kong
 List of villages in Hong Kong
 MacIntosh Forts
 Shatoujiao Subdistrict
 Yim Liu Ha

References

Further reading
  (includes a translation of a description of that year)

External links

 Delineation of area of existing village Sha Tau Kok Market (East) (Sha Tau Kok) for election of resident representative (2019 to 2022)
 Delineation of area of existing village Sha Tau Kok Market (West Lower) (Sha Tau Kok) for election of resident representative (2019 to 2022)
 Delineation of area of existing village Sha Tau Kok Market (West Upper) (Sha Tau Kok) for election of resident representative (2019 to 2022)
 Details of Sha Tau Kok from HK-place.com
 Details of the rural area of Sha Tau Kok from HK-place.com

 
Divided cities
North District, Hong Kong
Closed Area
China–Hong Kong border crossings
Hakka culture in Hong Kong
Restricted areas of Hong Kong red public minibus